Slagharen is a village in the municipality of Hardenberg in the province of Overijssel, Netherlands. The village started as a peat excavation village. It is known for the Attractiepark Slagharen, an amusement park.

History
All except for a Frisian family were from neighbouring Germany, and were living in sod houses on the moorland. 

In 1844, the name Slagharen first appeared, and means "parcel [of land] on sandy ground". The predominantly German settlers resulted in the founding of a Catholic church in 1843. The church was replaced in 1967. In 1859, the gristmill  was built near the village. In 1975, it was bought by the amusement park and restored.

In 1952, a mail order company, opened in Slagharen. It quickly developed into one of largest mail order companies of the Netherlands. In 1975, it moved to Zwolle, and is nowadays a large online shop. 

In 1963, the Ponypark Slagharen opened where you could stay in a holiday house with your own Shetland pony. In 1972, it turned into an amusement park.

Notable people 
 Chantal Beltman (born 1976), former professional cyclist
 Gerard Nijkamp (born 1970) is a football player and manager

Gallery

References 

Populated places in Overijssel
Hardenberg